Tango Notturno is a 1937 German drama film directed by Fritz Kirchhoff and starring Pola Negri, Albrecht Schoenhals, and Lina Carstens.

The film's sets were designed by the art director Carl Böhm (art director) and Erich Czerwonski. It was shot at the Babelsberg Studios in Berlin.

The film made a hit of Pola Negri's rendition of the song "Ich hab' an dich gedacht" (lyrics by Hans-Fritz Beckman, music by Hans-Otto Borgmann) which gave its title to the film. Negri's role was originally intended for Marlene Dietrich.

Cast

References

Bibliography

External links
 

1937 films
Films of Nazi Germany
1930s German-language films
Films directed by Fritz Kirchhoff
1937 drama films
German drama films
Terra Film films
Films shot at Babelsberg Studios
German black-and-white films
1930s German films